Happy Birthday is a 2016 American horror-thriller film written and directed by Casey Tebo. The film stars Matt Bush and Riley Litman as two friends that travel to Mexico and end up getting kidnapped.  Happy Birthday also stars Steven Tyler of Aerosmith as a shaman.

Plot 

Brady and Tommy have decided to travel to Mexico in search of drinks and debauchery to celebrate Brady's birthday and to help him get over his girlfriend's infidelity. Their vacation takes a dark turn after they pick up two American women, Katie and Lucia, who trick the two men and kidnap them as part of a scheme by the local drug lords to gain ransom money from their parents.

Cast 
 Matt Bush as Brady Baxter
 Riley Litman as Tommy Quinn
 Vanessa Lengies as Katie Elizondo
 Britne Oldford as Lucia Frankie Allen
 Erik Palladino as The Texican
 Matt Willig as El Caballo
 Steven Tyler as Kasape Sukka
 Robert Miano as El Gato Enfermo
 Tristin Mays as Janie
 Jeff Daniel Phillips as Frank Zappa
 Inanna Sarkis as Kasape Sukka's girlfriend

Reception 
The Los Angeles Times panned the film overall, writing that "Tebo brings some admirable ambition to this microbudget project" but that "from the overwritten, pop-culture-reference-laden dialogue to the incessant attempts to be shocking, “Happy Birthday” tries way too hard." The Hollywood Reporter also reviewed the movie, stating "A bizarre mixture of black comedy and horror/suspense, Happy Birthday is a juvenile effort that at least has the decency to make its American and Mexican characters look equally bad."

In contrast, genre website Bloody Disgusting praised the movie and felt that "the sheer originality behind Happy Birthday makes up for most of its cinematic blunders" and that "Tebo’s direction and storytelling skills shine brightly in this flawed but compelling thriller."

See also 
 List of films featuring kidnapping

References

External links 
 

2016 films
2016 horror films
2016 horror thriller films
American horror thriller films
Cockfighting in film
2010s English-language films
2010s American films